Dia Mirza Rekhi (born Dia Handrich; 9 December 1981) is an Indian model, actress, producer, and social worker who predominantly works in Hindi films. Mirza won the title of Miss Asia Pacific International in 2000 after being crowned Femina Miss India Asia Pacific 2000. She made her acting debut with Rehnaa Hai Terre Dil Mein (2001).

She subsequently featured in films including Dus (2005), Lage Raho Munna Bhai (2006) Honeymoon Travels Pvt. Ltd. (2007) and Sanju (2018). She co-owned a production house, Born Free Entertainment, with her ex-husband Sahil Sangha. Their first film, Love Breakups Zindagi, was released on 7 October 2011. After their divorce she launched her own production house, "One India Stories" in December 2019. She also appeared in the web series Kaafir in 2019.

Early life
Mirza was born in Hyderabad, India. Her father, Frank Handrich, is a German graphics and industrial fair designer, architect, artist and interior designer based in Munich, while her mother, Deepa, is a Bengali interior designer and landscaper who also volunteers to help alcoholics and drug addicts. When she was four-and-a-half years old, her parents got divorced. After her mother married Ahmed Mirza, a Muslim man from Hyderabad, she adopted her step-father's surname. He died in 2004.

After initially attending Vidyaranya High School, a co-ed school, Mirza was enrolled into Nasr School, a girls day school in Khairtabad. She then attended Stanley Junior College before graduating with a Bachelor of Arts from Ambedkar Open University, Hyderabad.

Career

Modelling 
Mirza worked while in college as a marketing executive for a media firm, Neeraj's Multi-media Studio. At the same time, she modelled for print and TV commercials for brands such as Lipton, Wall's ice cream, Emami and many more. She was the second runner-up at the Miss India pageant in 2000 and  then went on to win the Miss Asia Pacific title in 2000.

Acting 
She made her debut in Rehnaa Hai Terre Dil Mein, which did not do well at the box office, though it developed a cult following among Indian youth. She then appeared in movies such as Alag, Dum, Deewaanapan, Tumko Na Bhool Paayenge, Tumsa Nahin Dekha: A Love Story, Parineeta, Dus, Lage Raho Munna Bhai and Salaam Mumbai. In 2018, she appeared as Sanjay Dutt's wife Manyata Dutt in the biopic Sanju, which ranks among the highest grossing Indian films. In 2020, she had a small role in Thappad, which went on to win the Filmfare Award for Best Film.

She appeared in the ZEE5 web series Kaafir in 2019. Set in Kashmir, she starred opposite Mohit Raina in the series.

Producer 
In 2011, she started Born Free Entertainment, a production house along with her ex-husband Sahil Sangha. She has also produced Love Breakups Zindagi, Bobby Jasoos and a sitcom web series titled Mind the Malhotras, streaming on Amazon Prime Video. The series stars Cyrus Sahukar and Mini Mathur in the lead. In December 2019 she announced she was forming a new production house "One India Stories" to create original content.

Humanitarian causes 
Mirza lent her voice to a snow leopard called Layla for an environmental podcast of Run Wild, which is a collaboration between Runtastic, the UN Environmental Programme and Internet of Elephants.

She has written articles for Hindustan Times and other publications.

Titles 
Mirza was the second runner-up at Femina Miss India 2000 and was subsequently sent to Miss Asia Pacific 2000, where she won. She also won Miss Beautiful Smile, Miss Avon and Miss Close-Up Smile in Miss India. When she won the Miss Asia Pacific title on 3 December 2000 in Manila, the Philippines, she became the first Indian since Tara Anne Fonseca to win this title in 27 years. She completed the hat-trick of India winning international pageants in the year 2000; Lara Dutta won the Miss Universe title and Priyanka Chopra won the Miss World title in the same year.

Community services and activism 
Mirza has been involved with Cancer Patients Aid Association and Spastics Society of India, and has worked extensively with the government of Andhra Pradesh to spread HIV awareness, prevention of female foeticide, PETA, CRY and most recently the NDTV Greenathon – an effort to find tangible solutions against pollution and the book, "Deke Dheko" by Radio Mirchi (a campaign initiated to collect books for underprivileged children).  She is on the board of the Coca-Cola foundation that works towards development in rural India. She is associated with campaigns such as Sanctuary Asia's Leave Me Alone and Female Foeticide.

In 2010 she adopted two cheetah cubs at the Prince of Wales zoological park in Lucknow.

Mirza, along with Aamir Khan, publicly expressed support for the Narmada Bachao Andolan, a group protesting the building of a dam. This aroused the ire of political activists from the Bharatiya Janata Party, who led a protest march against the actress. She won the Green Award at IIFA 2012 for spreading awareness about environment-related issues.

Along with these, Mirza has endorsed The Body Shop for their stand on a ban on animal testing and propagation of recycled packaging and natural products. She is the Eco-Ambassador for Panasonic.

Mirza has been felicitated at award functions for her active involvement in social and environmental issues.

She has been named the ambassador for the Swachh Bharat Mission's youth-based 'Swachh Saathi' programme. As an ambassador, the actress would interact with school and college students from across the country through awareness sessions, community cleaning activities and motivational videos.

She joined Save The Children India as their first ever artist ambassador.

On World Environment Day 2017, she was appointed brand ambassador for the Wildlife Trust of India. She has lent her support to WTI's wildlife conservation endeavours for several years and is a founder-member of the organisation's Club Nature initiative, also supporting a campaign to raise awareness about the shrinking space for wild elephants in the country.

She was also appointed as the UN Environment's Goodwill Ambassador for India in 2017 and on 7 May 2020, her term was further extended till 2022. She was appointed by the Secretary-General of the United Nations as an advocate of Sustainable Development Goals. She also turned into a blogger to save the environment and create awareness. She hosted United Nations Champions Gala 2019 with Hollywood actor Alec Baldwin. She attended the 14th UN Conference of the Parties and hosted the finale reception.

Mirza initiated a cleanliness drive at Juhu beach on Independence Day 2019 and another at Mahim beach on 26 January, to make the beach free from single-use plastic.

Mirza supports Ramky's BIG Green Ganesha and felicitated the winners with Tree Ganeshas in 2019.

Personal life
In April 2014, she became engaged to her longtime business partner Sahil Sangha, and they were married on 18 October 2014 at his farmhouse in Chattarpur on the outskirts of Delhi. In August 2019, Mirza announced their separation. 

On 15 February 2021, Mirza married businessman Vaibhav Rekhi in Bandra, Mumbai.

On 1 April 2021, she announced that she is expecting her first child. On 14 July 2021, she announced that she had a premature birth to a baby boy, Avyaan Azaad Rekhi on 14 May and he was in NICU for 2 months. Mirza also has a step-daughter, Samaira Rekhi from Rekhi's first marriage.

Filmography

Films

Web series

Television

Awards 

2002
 Zee Cine Award for Best Female Debut: Rehnaa Hai Terre Dil Mein
 Bollywood Movie Award – Best Female Debut: Rehnaa Hai Terre Dil Mein
Nominated, Filmfare Award for Best Female Debut: Rehnaa Hai Terre Dil Mein
 Nominated, Screen Award for Best Female Debut: Rehnaa Hai Terre Dil Mein
 Nominated, Screen Award for Best Female Debut: Deewaanapan

2012
 IIFA Green Award for Contribution Towards a Greener Environment

2016
 Ms. Eternal Beauty at the Femina Miss India

2019 
 Best actor OTT female (critics) for Kaafir at Gold Awards 2019
woman of style & substance at Filmfare glamour & style awards 2019

2022
 Dia Mirza honoured with 'Mother Teresa Memorial Award' by the Governor of Maharashtra.

References

External links 

 
 

Living people
1981 births
Femina Miss India winners
Actresses in Hindi cinema
Actresses in Bengali cinema
Indian film actresses
Indian people of German descent
Bengali people
Female models from Hyderabad, India
Actresses from Hyderabad, India
Indian women film producers
Film producers from Hyderabad, India
21st-century Indian actresses
Businesswomen from Andhra Pradesh
Miss Asia Pacific International winners